José Hernández (born 12 April 1996) is a Mexican professional footballer who plays as a midfielder for Phoenix Rising FC of the USL Championship.

Career
Hernandez spent the last two years of his youth career with Real Salt Lake's youth academy in Arizona.  On 5 February 2015, it was announced that Hernandez signed a letter of intent to play college soccer at UCLA.  On 22 March, he made his professional debut with RSL's USL affiliate club Real Monarchs SLC in a 0–0 draw against LA Galaxy II.

Hernandez was able to maintain his college eligibility despite appearing for Real Monarchs and on August 29, he made his collegiate debut in the Bruins 1–0 victory over New Mexico.

He also played in the Premier Development League for FC Golden State Force.

On December 21, 2016, Hernandez signed a homegrown player contract with Real Salt Lake.

On February 1, 2019, Hernández joined USL Championship side LA Galaxy II.

On December 19, 2019, Hernández moved to USL side Oklahoma City Energy.

Hernández joined USL Championship side Oakland Roots on January 8, 2021. He left Oakland following their 2022 season. He then signed with Phoenix Rising FC on December 9, 2022.

Honours
Real Monarchs
USL Championship Regular Season Title: 2017

References

External links
UCLA Bruins bio
USSF Development Academy bio

1996 births
Living people
People from Casa Grande, Arizona
Sportspeople from the Phoenix metropolitan area
Footballers from Mexico City
Soccer players from Arizona
Mexican footballers
Association football midfielders
UCLA Bruins men's soccer players
Real Monarchs players
FC Golden State Force players
Real Salt Lake players
LA Galaxy II players
OKC Energy FC players
Oakland Roots SC players
Phoenix Rising FC players
USL Championship players
USL League Two players
Major League Soccer players
Mexican expatriate footballers
Mexican expatriate sportspeople in the United States
Expatriate soccer players in the United States
Homegrown Players (MLS)